The 2019 Nadkarni Cup is the 112th season of the Nadkarni Cup, a football competition played in Mumbai, Indiain state of Maharashtra. The 16 teams will play the tournament. The cup will commence from 21 August 2019.

Teams
A total of 16 teams are participating in this year's competition. 11 teams from MDFA Elite Division and 5 from MDFA Super Division.

MDFA Elite Division
Air India
Century Rayon
Central Bank Of India
Companeros
FSI - Sea View
HDFC Bank
Karnatak Sporting Association
Millat FC
Mumbai Customs
Rhema S.F
Union Bank Of India

MDFA Super Division
Atlanta FC
Bank Of Baroda
Iron Born - CFCI (U18)
Kenkre FC (U18)
Mumbai City (U18)

Group stage

Group A

Group B

Group C

Group D

Knockout stage

Bracket

Quarter-finals

Semi-finals

Final

Goalscrores
4 goals
  Pradeep Mannewar (Union Bank Of India)

3 goals

  Vallentine Pereira (Union Bank Of India)
  Rosenberg Gabriel (Air India)
  Rishikesh Shinde (Air India)

2 goals

  Hari Saini (Rhema S.F)
  Johnson D’silva (Air India)
  Elvin Fernandes (Union Bank Of India)
  Jay Wadhwa (Union Bank Of India)

1 goal

  Allan Dias (Karnatak Sporting Association)
  V. Luikham (Century Rayon)
  Sagar Bedkar (Century Rayon)
  Pawan Mali (Karnatak Sporting Association)
  Roger Sam (Karnatak Sporting Association)
  Aman Mangani (Iron Born - CFCI)
  Zingshepam Lungleng (Century Rayon)
  Venkatesh Tolimala (Century Rayon)
  Sheng Sheng (Century Rayon)
  Sunil Mani (Century Rayon)
  Janal Kumar Mandvi (Century Rayon)
  Thalchan Vashum (Century Rayon))
  Dhawal Waghela (Mumbai Customs)
  Ramesh Singh (HDFC Bank)
  Prashant Rane (HDFC Bank)
  Kevin Fernandes (Bank Of Baroda)
  Melchoir Fernandes (HDFC Bank)
  Hekmat Singh (Mumbai Customs)
  Tarique Ansari (Millat FC)
  Abhishek Bhopale (FSI – Sea View)
  Sanchit Singh (Air India)
  Shreyas Vatekar (Mumbai City U-18)
  Sumesh Nair (Air India)
  Twain Fernandes (Mumbai City U-18)
  Abel Fernandes (Mumbai City U-18)
  Izaan Shaikh (Mumbai City U-18)
  Ehtesham Mujawar (Rhema S.F)
  Sherwyn Chang (Union Bank Of India)
  Vasant Thapa (Rhema S.F)
  Hasan Golwalla (Union Bank Of India)
  Ashiqe Mohammed (Air India)
  Athang Kanekar (Union Bank Of India)

References

MDFA Elite Division
2018–19 in Indian football